Gonolobus naturalistae is a species of perennial vine in the milkweed genus Gonolobus. It is endemic to Mexico.

Taxonomy
Gonolobus naturalistae was first described in 2020 by Leonardo O. Alvarado-Cárdenas, María Guadalupe Chávez Hernández, and Juan Fernando Pio Leon. It was named in honor of NaturaLista, a partnership between iNaturalist and the Comisión Nacional para el Conocimiento y Uso de la Biodiversidad (CONABIO).

Distribution and habitat
This species is found in tropical dry forests of Chihuahua and Sinaloa in Mexico.

Ecology
This species often grows in the company of Pithecellobium dulce as well as species within the genus Vachellia.

References

naturalistae
Endemic flora of Mexico
Plants described in 2020